Chabranco is a hamlet in the hills northeast of Maihue Lake, south-central Chile. It lies along to road to Lilpela Pass and the hot springs of Chihuío. It had 174 inhabitants as of 2017.

References

Populated places in Ranco Province